Alexander Vainberg (Russian: Александр Владеленович Вайнберг; born 2 February 1961) is a Russian politician serving as a senator from the Legislative Assembly of Nizhny Novgorod Oblast since 6 October 2021.

Alexander Vainberg is under personal sanctions introduced by the European Union, the United Kingdom, the USA, Canada, Switzerland, Australia, Ukraine, New Zealand, for ratifying the decisions of the "Treaty of Friendship, Cooperation and Mutual Assistance between the Russian Federation and the Donetsk People's Republic and between the Russian Federation and the Luhansk People's Republic" and providing political and economic support for Russia's annexation of Ukrainian territories.

Biography

Alexander Vainberg was born on 2 February 1961 in Nizhny Novgorod Oblast. In 1992, he graduated from the Gorky State Pedagogical Institute. From 1980 to 1982, Vainberg served in the Soviet Army. As a student, he moved to Moscow to start a musical career, and he even got accepted as a guitarist to the Lyube band. In 1995, he also founded his own band called "Nashe delo". In 1999, he also started to be engaged in politics and, in 2002, joined the Unity party. From 2006 to 2011, he was the deputy of the Legislative Assembly of Nizhny Novgorod Oblast of the 4th, 5th, and 6th convocations. From March 2006 to March 2009, Vainberg headed the regional branch of the United Party. On 23 June 2011, he became the senator from the Legislative Assembly of Nizhny Novgorod Oblast. Later, he was re-elected. His last term started on 6 October 2021.

References

Living people
1961 births
United Russia politicians
21st-century Russian politicians
People from Nizhny Novgorod Oblast
Members of the Federation Council of Russia (after 2000)